Khoza is a surname. Notable people with the surname include:

Buti Khoza (born 1988), South African footballer
Irvin Khoza (born 1948), South African football administrator and businessman
Makhosi Khoza (born ?), South African politician and writing system creator
Nonhlanhla Khoza (born ?), South African politician
Ntshingwayo Khoza (1809–1883), Zulu general
Snowy Khoza (born ?), South African business executive

Nhleleko Sboniso Khoza 2005-Present.
A public figure most notable for his Stargazing career in the South African Beauty Industry.

Bantu-language surnames